The New Taiwan dollar (code: TWD; symbol: NT$, also abbreviated as NT) is the official currency of the Republic of China (Taiwan). The New Taiwan dollar has been the currency of the island of Taiwan since 1949, when it replaced the Old Taiwan dollar, at a rate of 40,000 old dollars per one new dollar. The basic unit of the New Taiwan dollar is called a yuan and is subdivided into ten jiao, and into 100 fen or cents, although in practice both jiao and fen are never actually used.

There are a variety of alternative names for the units in Taiwan.

The central bank of Taiwan has issued the New Taiwan Dollar since 2000. Prior to 2000, the Bank of Taiwan issued banknotes as the de facto central bank between 1949 and 1961, and after 1961 continued to issue banknotes as a delegate of the central bank. The central bank began issuing New Taiwan dollar banknotes in July 2000, and the notes issued by the Bank of Taiwan were taken out of circulation.

Terminology

The adjective "new" is only added in formal contexts where it is necessary to avoid any ambiguity, even though ambiguity is virtually non-existent today. These contexts include banking, contracts, or foreign exchange. They are both pronounced yuán in Mandarin but have different pronunciations in Taiwanese Hokkien (îⁿ, goân) and Hakka (yèn, ngièn). The name  in Taiwanese Hokkien and Hakka for cent is likely from the hundredth unit  (sen) of Japanese era Taiwanese yen or from English.

In English usage, the New Taiwan dollar is often abbreviated as NT, NT$, or NT dollar, while the abbreviation TWD is typically used in the context of foreign exchange rates. Subdivisions of a New Taiwan dollar are rarely used since practically all products on the consumer market are sold in whole dollars. Nevertheless, banks do record cents (hundredth of dollars).

History
The various currencies called yuan or dollar issued in China, as well as the Japanese yen, were all derived from the Spanish American silver dollar, which China imported in large quantities from Spanish America through Spanish Philippines in the Manila-Acapulco Galleon Trade from the 16th to 20th centuries. After the use of the Spanish dollar and silver Chinese yuan in Taiwan, it issued the Taiwanese yen in 1895, followed by the Old Taiwan dollar in 1946.

The Bank of Taiwan first issued the New Taiwan dollar on 15 June 1949 to replace the Old Taiwan dollar at a ratio of 40,000 to one. The first goal of the New Taiwan dollar was to end the hyperinflation that had plagued Nationalist China due to the Chinese Civil War.

After the communists captured Beijing in January 1949, the Nationalists began to retreat to Taiwan. China's gold reserve was moved to Taiwan in February 1949. The government then declared in the Temporary Provisions Effective During the Period of Communist Rebellion that dollars issued by the Bank of Taiwan would become the new currency in circulation.

Even though the New Taiwan dollar was the de facto currency of Taiwan, statutes after 1949 still define the silver yuan or silver dollar as the legal currency, worth NT$3. Many older statutes have fines and fees given in silver yuan. Its value of NT$3 has not been updated despite decades of inflation, making the silver yuan a purely notional currency a long time ago, inconvertible to actual silver.

When the Temporary Provisions were made ineffective in 1991, the ROC lacked a legal national currency until the year 2000, when the Central Bank of China (CBC) replaced the Bank of Taiwan in issuing NT bills. In July 2000, the New Taiwan dollar became Taiwan's legal currency. It is no longer secondary to the silver yuan. At this time, the central bank began issuing New Taiwan dollar banknotes, and the notes issued earlier by the Bank of Taiwan were taken out of circulation.

The exchange rate compared to the United States dollar has varied from less than ten to one in the mid-1950s, more than forty to one in the 1960s, and about twenty-five to one in 1992. The exchange rate as of July 2021 is NT$27.93 per US$.

Coins
The denominations of the New Taiwan dollar in circulation are:

Coins are minted by the Central Mint, while notes are printed by the Central Engraving and Printing Plant. Both are run by the Central Bank. The 50¢ coin is rare because of its low value, while the NT$20 coin is rare because of the government's lack of willingness to promote it. As of 2010, the cost of the raw materials in a 50¢ coin was more than the face value of the coin.

Banknotes

The current series of banknotes for the New Taiwan dollar began circulation in July 2000. This set was introduced when the  New Taiwan dollar succeeded the silver yuan as the official currency within Taiwan.

The current set includes banknotes for NT$100, NT$200, NT$500, NT$1000, and NT$2000. Note that the NT$200 and NT$2000 banknotes are not commonly used by consumers. This may be due to the tendency of consumers to simply use multiple NT$100 or NT$500 bills to cover the range of NT$200, as well as using multiple NT$1000 bills or credit/debit cards instead of the NT$2000 bill. Lack of government promotion may also be a contributing factor to the general lack of usage.

It is relatively easy for the government to disseminate these denominations through various government bodies that do official business with the citizens, such as the post office, the tax authority, or state-owned banks. There is also a conspiracy theory against the Democratic Progressive Party, the ruling party at the time the NT$200 and NT$2000 denominations were issued. The conspiracy states that putting Chiang Kai-shek on a rarely used banknote would "practically" remove him from the currency while "nominally" including him on the currency would not upset supporters on the other side of the political spectrum that much (the Pan-Blue Coalition).

The year 2000 version $500 and 1999 version $1000 notes without holographic strip were officially taken out of circulation on 1 August 2007. They were redeemable at commercial banks until 30 September 2007. As of 1 October 2007, only Bank of Taiwan accepts such notes.

100-dollar commemorative note

On 6 January 2011, the Central Bank of the Republic of China issued a new 100-dollar legal tender circulating commemorative in celebration of the 100th anniversary of the founding of the Republic of China. The red paper note measures 145 × 70 mm and features a portrait of Dr. Sun Yat-sen on the front and the Chung-Shan Building on the back. The design is no different from the ordinary NT$100 note, except for the Chinese wording on the reverse of the note, which reads "Celebrating 100 years since the founding of the Republic of China".

Exchange rates

See also 
 Old Taiwan dollar
 Economy of Taiwan
 Taxation in Taiwan
 History of the Republic of China
 ROC consumer voucher

Notes

Words in different languages

References

External links 

  SinoBanknote
  Banknotes of Matsu, Quemoy and Tachen
  The Central Bank page showcasing all obsolete issues of the new Taiwan dollar in all denominations
 Close up image of a circulated 50 NT coin 
  Historical and current banknotes of Taiwan

Currencies of Taiwan
Taiwan under Republic of China rule
Currencies introduced in 1949